Eastchester Union Free School District is a school district headquartered in Eastchester, New York.

In 2013 Walter Moran became the superintendent. In the summer of 2018 he stated that he would retire. Robert Glass became the superintendent in 2019.

Schools
 Secondary
 Eastchester High School
 Eastchester Middle School

 Primary
 Anne Hutchinson Elementary School (grades 2–5)
 Greenvale Elementary School (grades 2–5) - In 2015 Darrell Stinchcomb became the principal.
 Waverly School (K-1)

References

External links
 Eastchester Union Free School District

School districts in Westchester County, New York